The United States Virgin Islands competed at the 1972 Summer Olympics in Munich, West Germany. Sixteen competitors, all men, took part in nine events in four sports.

Athletics

Men
Track & road events

Boxing

Men

Sailing

Open

Shooting

Six male shooters represented the Virgin Islands in 1972.
Open

References

External links
Official Olympic Reports

Nations at the 1972 Summer Olympics
1972 Summer Olympics
1972 in the United States Virgin Islands
1972 in United States Virgin Islands sports